Giovanni Antonio Battarra (Coriano, 9 June 1714 – Rimini, 8 November 1789) was an Italian priest, naturalist, and mycologist. In 1755, he published Fungorum Agri Ariminensis Historia, consisting of 80 pages and illustrated with 40 copper plates drawn and engraved by himself, in which he described 248 species of fungi. 

He visited and consulted with the Abbot Bruno Tozzi, a celebrated amateur botanist in Florence.

Eponymous species
Amanitopsis battarrae Boud., 1902 (now Amanita battarrae)
Battarrea Pers. (1801)
Hypocrea subgen. Battarrina Sacc., 1883
Phoma battarreae
Pleurotus battarrae Quél., 1879
 Agaricus battarrae Fr., 1821 (now Psathyrella battarrae)

See also
List of mycologists

References

External links 

Google Books Online edition of Fungorum Agri Ariminensis Historia

1714 births
1789 deaths
Italian mycologists